Bakers Bend is a rural locality in the Shire of Murweh, Queensland, Australia.

Geography 
The Warrego River meanders from north to south through the locality. The Western railway line from Charlevillle to Cunnamulla runs north to south through the locality, east of the river. The Mitchell Highway runs from north to south through the locality parallel and immediately east of the railway line.

The now abandoned town of Wallal is within the locality.

Heritage listings 
Bakers Bend has a number of heritage-listed sites, including:
 off the Diamantina Developmental Road: Myendetta Homestead
 off the Mitchell Highway: Landsborough's Blazed Tree (Camp 69)

References

 
Shire of Murweh
Localities in Queensland